No. 1302 (Meteorological) Flight was formed at RAF Yelahanka, Karnataka, British India, on 31 July 1943 by re-designating No. 3 Meteorological Flight RAF. The flight was disbanded on 1 June 1946 at RAF Bangalore, Karnataka, British India.

Aircraft operated

Flight airfields

References
Notes

Bibliography

 Delve, Ken. The Source Book of the RAF. Shrewsbury, Shropshire, UK: Airlife Publishing, 1994. .
 Lake, Alan. Flying Units of the RAF. Shrewsbury, Shropshire, UK: Airlife Publishing, 1999. .
 Sturtivant, Ray, ISO and John Hamlin. RAF Flying Training And Support Units since 1912. Tonbridge, Kent, UK: Air-Britain (Historians) Ltd., 2007. .

1302 Flight
Military units and formations established in 1943
Royal Air Force